Baie-des-Sables is a municipality in La Matanie Regional County Municipality in the Bas-Saint-Laurent region of Quebec, Canada.

Its elevation is 577 ft.

Demographics

See also
 List of municipalities in Quebec

References

Municipalities in Quebec
Incorporated places in Bas-Saint-Laurent